The keelson or kelson is a reinforcing structural member on top of the keel in the hull of a wooden vessel.

In part V of “Song of Myself”,  American poet Walt Whitman uses the phrase: “And that a kelson of the creation is love;” to imply that love is akin to a keelson, or backbone, that supports humanity.

References

Nautical terminology
Shipbuilding